Thubana xanthoteles is a species of moth of the family Lecithoceridae first described by Edward Meyrick in 1923. It is found in Yunnan province in China, and in Thailand, India and Sri Lanka.

Taxonomy
Meyrick described Thubana xanthoteles on the basis of two female specimens and described Thubana melitopyga from one female specimen. John Frederick Gates Clarke regarded Thubana melitopyga as a junior synonym of Thubana xanthoteles. Kyu-Tek Park described Thubana stenosis on the basis of specimens collected from north Thailand, which bears a "golden yellow bandlike costal patch" on the forewing. He also noticed that the female genitalia of Thubana stenosis are hardly distinguishable from those of Thubana xanthoteles. Later study concluded that the male genitalia of the three specimens collected in south Yunnan undoubtedly match with those of Thubana stenosis described by Park, and the female genitalia match with those of Thubana stenosis and of Thubana xanthoteles.

External links
"Review of the genus Thubana Walker (Lepidoptera, Lecithoceridae) from China, with description of one new species"

Thubana
Moths described in 1923
Taxa named by Edward Meyrick